Nogometni klub Mengeš, commonly referred to as NK Mengeš or simply Mengeš, was a Slovenian football club which played in the town of Mengeš. The club was founded in 1928 and was dissolved in 1997, after the 1996–97 Slovenian Third League season.

Stadium
NK Mengeš played their home games at Stadion pod Gobavico. The stadium has a capacity for 800 spectators.

Honours
Slovenian Third League
 Winners: 1993–94

Slovenian Fourth Division:
 Winners: 1992–93

References

Association football clubs established in 1928
Defunct football clubs in Slovenia
1928 establishments in Slovenia
1997 disestablishments in Slovenia
Association football clubs disestablished in 1997